The National Order of Merit is the pre-eminent state decoration of the Republic of Guinea.

Orders, decorations, and medals of Guinea
Awards established in 1958
1958 establishments in Guinea